Andrews Chapel may refer to:

Andrews Chapel (McIntosh, Alabama)
Andrews Memorial Chapel, Dunedin, Florida, NRHP-listed
Andrews Chapel United Methodist Church, Durham, North Carolina